Pirkko Vilppunen (19 May 1934 – 2017) was a Finnish gymnast. She competed in seven events at the 1952 Summer Olympics.

References

External links
 

1934 births
2017 deaths
Finnish female artistic gymnasts
Olympic gymnasts of Finland
Gymnasts at the 1952 Summer Olympics
Sportspeople from Vyborg
20th-century Finnish women